The Seventh East Asia Summit was held in Phnom Penh, Cambodia on November 19–20, 2012. The East Asia Summit is an annual meeting of national leaders from the East Asian region and adjoining countries.

Attending delegations
The heads of state and heads of government of the eighteen countries participated in the summit.

Outcomes
The ongoing tensions arising from the territorial disputes in the South China Sea and the disputes in the East China Sea (the Senkaku Islands/Diaoyu Islands) overshadowed the effort to advance the trade and economic arrangements between members of the Summit.

Russian President Vladimir Putin did not attend and was represented by Foreign Minister Sergey Lavrov. The other members' leaders attended.

The Chairman's statement noted progress in the areas of environment and energy, education, finance, global health issues and pandemic diseases, natural disaster mitigation and ASEAN connectivity.

References

2012 conferences
2012 in international relations
21st-century diplomatic conferences (Asia-Pacific)
ASEAN meetings
2012 in Cambodia
Diplomatic conferences in Cambodia
21st century in Phnom Penh
November 2012 events in Asia